The third season of Psych originally aired in the United States on USA Network from July 18, 2008 to February 20, 2009.  It consisted of 16 episodes.  James Roday, Dulé Hill, Timothy Omundson, Maggie Lawson, Corbin Bernsen, and Kirsten Nelson reprised their roles as the main characters.  James Roday portrayed Shawn Spencer, a fake psychic detective who periodically consults for the Santa Barbara police department.  A DVD of the season was released on July 21, 2009.

Production
Steve Franks continued to serve as showrunner for the third season.  "I Know, You Know," performed by The Friendly Indians, continued to serve as the theme song for the series, though the Christmas-themed version used for the previous season's "Gus's Dad May Have Killed an Old Guy" was used again for "Christmas Joy."

Mel Damski returned to the series to direct three episodes, while John Badham and Stephen Surjik returned to direct two each.  Returning to direct one episode each were Steve Franks, John Landis, Eric Laneuville, and Tim Matheson.  New directors for the season, directing one episode each, were Jay Chandrasekhar, Martha Coolidge, Michael McMurray, Steve Miner, and series star James Roday.

Andy Berman and Steve Franks returned to write three episodes each, while Josh Bycel, Anupam Nigam, Saladin K. Patterson, and James Roday wrote two.  Tim Meltreger returned to pen one episode.  New writers for the season included Kell Cahoon, who wrote two episodes, and Victoria Walker, who wrote one.

Cast

James Roday continued to play fake psychic detective Shawn Spencer.  Burton "Gus" Guster returned, portrayed by Dulé Hill.  Timothy Omundson returned as Head Detective Carlton "Lassie" Lassiter, while Maggie Lawson continued to portray Juliet "Jules" O'Hara.  Corbin Bernsen was kept on as Henry Spencer.  Kirsten Nelson continued to receive star billing as Karen Vick, while her character was promoted to permanent Chief of the SBPD.

Sage Brocklebank continued in his role as Officer Buzz McNab in six episodes.  Liam James portrayed young Shawn, while Carlos McCullers II continued to play young Gus.  Cybill Shepherd joined the cast as Madeleine Spencer for three episodes.  Rachael Leigh Cook also joined the show, as Abigail Lytar.  Phylicia Rashad reprised her role as Winnie Guster, while the role of Bill Guster was turned over to Keith David.  Ally Sheedy made her first appearance as the deranged serial killer Mr. Yang.  Jimmi Simpson also made his debut on the show, as Mary Lightly.  Other prominent guests during the season included MacKenzie Astin, Justine Bateman, Sonja Bennett, Jere Burns, Faune A. Chambers, Gary Cole, Barry Corbin, Brooke D'Orsay, Jeff Fahey, Frank Gifford, Milena Govich, Elden Henson, Mickie James, Benjamin King,  Emma Lahana, Ted Lange, Jane Lynch, Christopher McDonald, Bruce McGill, Ted McGinley, Ty Olsson, Kelly Overton, Richard Riehle, Shawn Roberts, Alan Ruck, Cassandra Sawtell, Jonathan Silverman, Todd Stashwick, Serinda Swan, Janet Varney, Steven Weber, Christopher Wiehl, and Mykelti Williamson.

Episodes

References

Psych
2008 American television seasons
2009 American television seasons